Castello di Oricola (Italian for Castle of Oricola)  is a  Middle Ages castle in Oricola, Province of L'Aquila (Abruzzo).

History

Architecture

References

External links

Oricola
Oricola